Baastrup may refer to:
 Anne Baastrup (born 1952), Danish politician 
 Christian Ingerslev Baastrup (1855–1950), Danish radiologist
 Baastrup's sign, a disorder of the lumbar spine

See also
 Bastrop (disambiguation)